Pablo Fernández Blanco (born 17 September 1996) is a Spanish footballer who plays for Gimnàstic de Tarragona as either a right winger or a forward.

Club career
Born in Candás, Carreño, Asturias, Fernández represented Sporting de Gijón and Candás CF as a youth. He made his senior debut with the latter on 6 December 2012 at the age of just 16, coming on as a substitute in a 1–4 Tercera División home loss against CD Praviano.

Definitely promoted to the first team ahead of the 2013–14 campaign, Fernández scored his first senior goal on 30 October 2013 by netting the first in a 2–0 away win against Atlético de Lugones SD. The following July, he returned to Sporting, being assigned to the Juvenil A squad.

Fernández started to appear with the reserves during the season, with the side in Segunda División B. He made his first team – and La Liga – debut on 5 April 2017, replacing fellow youth graduate Nacho Cases in a 0–1 home loss against Málaga CF.

On 3 July 2019, Fernández left Sporting and signed for third division team UE Cornellà. On 28 June 2021, after two seasons as a regular starter, he agreed to a two-year deal with Gimnàstic de Tarragona in Primera División RFEF.

References

External links

1996 births
Living people
Spanish footballers
Footballers from Asturias
Association football wingers
Association football forwards
La Liga players
Segunda División B players
Tercera División players
Sporting de Gijón B players
Sporting de Gijón players
UE Cornellà players
Gimnàstic de Tarragona footballers